is the 14th single by Japanese entertainer Akina Nakamori. Written by Yoko Aki and Kisaburō Suzuki, it was released on February 3, 1986 by Warner Pioneer through the Reprise label as the lead single from her third compilation album CD'87.

Background 
"Desire (Jōnetsu)" was used by Pioneer Corporation for their Private CD 500AV commercial featuring Nakamori. Live TV performances of the song featured one of Nakamori's signature looks: a bob wig and a stylized purple and brown kimono with high-heeled shoes.

Nakamori performed the song on the 37th Kōhaku Uta Gassen, making her fourth appearance on NHK's New Year's Eve special.

Nakamori has re-recorded "Desire (Jōnetsu)" for the 1995 compilation True Album Akina 95 Best, the 2002 self-cover compilation Utahime Double Decade and as the B-side of her 2005 single "Rakka Ryūsui". In 2010, she re-recorded the song for the pachinko machine .

Chart performance 
"Desire (Jōnetsu)" became Nakamori's 11th No. 1 on Oricon's singles chart and sold 516,000 copies, becoming the second best-selling single of 1986 in the country. It won the Grand Prix at the numerous awards including 28th Japan Record Awards, 1st Japan Gold Disc Award, and 13th FNS Music Festival.

Track listing

Charts

Weekly charts

Year-end charts

Release history

Cover versions
 Mariko Takahashi covered the song on her 1989 cover album Sha.
 The Nolans covered the song in English on their 1991 cover album Tidal Wave (Samishii Nettaigyo).
 Haruka Nakanishi (as Toshiko Osoi) covered the song on the 2006 Mone soundtrack album Mansuri Mone on Vocal Collection Vol. 2.
 Nana Mizuki (as Moka Akashiya) covered the song on the 2008 Rosario + Vampire soundtrack album Rosario + Vampire CAPU 2.
 MAX covered the song on their 2010 cover album Be MAX.
 Juju covered the song on her 2016 cover album Snack Juju: Yoru no Request.
 Marina Shiraishi covered the song in 2016.
 Rondo covered the song on their 2021 album D4DJ Groovy Mix: Cover Tracks Vol. 1

References

External links 
 
 
 

1986 singles
1986 songs
Akina Nakamori songs
Japanese-language songs
Songs with lyrics by Yoko Aki
Warner Music Japan singles
Reprise Records singles
Oricon Weekly number-one singles